Circassia Group PLC is a company focussed on treating people suffering from respiratory diseases through its NIOX (Nitric Oxide) range of FeNO (Fractional Exhaled Nitric Oxide) devices which help diagnose and manage asthma. The company is a provider of point-of-care FeNO (Fractional Exhaled Nitric Oxide) measurement and monitoring. It is listed on the London Stock Exchange.

History
The company was founded by Steve Harris and Charles Swingland in 2006. It was the subject of an initial public offering in March 2014.

In December 2019, Steve Harris announced that he was resigning as CEO of the company. Ian Johnson took over as Executive Chairman of the company, Michael Roller replaced Julien Cotta as the Chief Financial Officer, and Jonathan Emms, who was appointed to the company in September 2019, became the Chief Operating Officer.

The company also announced its withdrawal from the COPD (chronic obstructive pulmonary disease) business in April 2020, with a proposed transfer of assets to, and termination of agreement with, AstraZeneca for consideration to be set off against debt and accrued interest.

Operations 
Circassia has direct offices in the United Kingdom, United States, Germany, Sweden and China. The company also operates through a distribution model, working with partner companies in order make NIOX available throughout the globe.

NIOX 
NIOX (Nitric Oxide) is a FeNO testing device. Using visual aids and sounds, NIOX provides an easy to use test experience to help patients perform FeNO (Fractional Exhaled Nitric Oxide) tests.

FeNO aids healthcare professionals with the diagnosis and management of asthma.

References

External links
 Official site
NIOX product website

Pharmaceutical companies established in 2006
Companies based in Oxford